Dawid Szulich (born 19 May 1990 in Warsaw) is a Polish swimmer. At the 2012 Summer Olympics, he competed in the Men's 100 metre breaststroke, finishing in 32nd place in the heats, failing to reach the semifinals.

References

External links
 pkol.pl 

Polish male breaststroke swimmers
1990 births
Living people
Olympic swimmers of Poland
Swimmers at the 2012 Summer Olympics
Swimmers from Warsaw